Shepparton railway station is located on the Tocumwal line in Victoria, Australia. It serves the city of Shepparton, and it opened on 13 January 1880.

It is the terminus for V/Line services from Melbourne. A 725 metre long crossing loop is located opposite the station.

The station opened as a temporary terminus of the line from Mangalore, on the main North East line. The line was extended north to Numurkah in 1881, and a branch line to Dookie opened in 1888.

A number of goods sidings are located between the station and crossing loop, which is used to stable the container freight service to Tocumwal, and for shunting the now defunct oil train. Further sidings are located to the south, the first serving disused British Imperial Oil Company, Vacuum Oil Coy and C.O.R. Oil Coy depots. To the north were sidings for livestock, and a second oil terminal, which was in use until 2008, when oil services were discontinued by Pacific National. The department siding (pear packing siding) was abolished in April 1979, with the former weighbridge siding removed in July 1988, with the weighbridge itself and points leading to the siding removed not long after.

Boom barriers were provided at the High Street level crossing, located nearby in the Down direction of the station, in 1973.

The V/Line Freightgate centre opened at Shepparton in April 1985. Costing $100,000, it was officially opened by V/Line chairman, Mr. Keith Fitzmaurice. The centre covered 2,000 cubic metres, and could have handled 500 pallets each week. During this time, the passenger facilities in the main station building were also refurbished.

The V/Line passenger service once continued further north to Cobram, until these services were withdrawn on 21 August 1993.

Platforms and services

Shepparton has one platform. It is serviced by V/Line Shepparton line services.

Platform 1:
 services to and from Southern Cross

Transport links

Dysons operates one route via Shepparton station, under contract to Public Transport Victoria:
: Shepparton – Archer

References

External links
Victorian Railway Stations gallery

Railway stations in Australia opened in 1880
Regional railway stations in Victoria (Australia)
Shepparton